Cognatiyoonia koreensis is a Gram-negative, non-spore-forming and non-motile bacterium from the genus of Cognatiyoonia which has been isolated from sea sand from the Homi cape in Pohang in Korea.

References

Rhodobacteraceae
Bacteria described in 2006